Mutaro Embaló (born 12 December 1992), known as Bata, is a Guinea-Bissauan professional footballer who plays as a forward.

External links

Bata at ZeroZero

1992 births
Sportspeople from Bissau
Living people
Bissau-Guinean footballers
Guinea-Bissau international footballers
Association football forwards
A.C. Alcanenense players
S.C. Covilhã players
Bissau-Guinean expatriate footballers
Expatriate footballers in Portugal
Bissau-Guinean expatriate sportspeople in Portugal
Liga Portugal 2 players
Portimonense S.C. players
Atlético Clube de Portugal players
F.C. Penafiel players
U.D. Oliveirense players
Sertanense F.C. players
Clube Oriental de Lisboa players
G.D. Vitória de Sernache players
Segunda Divisão players